P. Ramdas (December 1933 – 27 March 2014) was an Indian film director and screenwriter best known for his film Newspaper Boy which was influenced by Italian neorealism. In 2007, he was awarded the J. C. Daniel Award, Kerala government's highest honour for contributions to Malayalam cinema.
He is a former student of Church Mission Society High School, Thrissur (CMSHSS, Thrissur).

Filmography

References

External links
 
   'ന്യൂസ് പേപ്പര്‍ ബോയി'യുടെ സംവിധായകന്‍ അന്തരിച്ചു
   Malayalam director P Ramdas passes away

1930s births
2014 deaths
J. C. Daniel Award winners
Film directors from Thrissur
20th-century Indian film directors
Screenwriters from Kerala
Writers from Thrissur
20th-century Indian dramatists and playwrights
Odia film directors
Malayalam film directors
Malayalam screenwriters